Hackley is an unincorporated community in Washington Parish, Louisiana, United States. The community is located   N of Franklinton, Louisiana.

Etymology
It is speculated that the name of the community is derived from the surname of Charles Hackley a timber baron that owned over 200,000 acres of land in Louisiana.

Old railroad
Between 1892 and 1922 there was a  railroad built by the Brooks-Scanlon Lumber Company that ran from Kentwood, Louisiana and terminated at Hackley. The railroad was leased and operated by the Kentwood and Eastern Railway.

References

Unincorporated communities in Washington Parish, Louisiana
Unincorporated communities in Louisiana